Cameron Bradley John (born 24 August 1999) is an English footballer who plays as a central defender for  club Rochdale.

Career

Early career
As a youth player, John moved from Southend United to Wolves in 2015.

Doncaster Rovers
He joined Doncaster Rovers on a season long loan on 2 August 2019. He later signed on a two-year deal on 28 August 2020. John was released by the club following relegation at the end of the 2021–22 season.

Rochdale
On 28 June 2022, John agreed to join Rochdale on a two-year deal.

Career statistics

References

External links

1999 births
Living people
English footballers
Association football defenders
Wolverhampton Wanderers F.C. players
Doncaster Rovers F.C. players
Rochdale A.F.C. players
English Football League players
Black British sportspeople